John Dunstan Skelley (12 November 1918 – 6 March 1971) was an Australian rules footballer who played for the Port Adelaide. During his career he won the clubs Best and Fairest in 1941 and two premierships, one in 1939 and another in 1942 during the WWII competition.

Prior to his football career, he served in World War II.

References

1918 births
1971 deaths
Port Adelaide Football Club (SANFL) players
Port Adelaide Football Club players (all competitions)
Australian rules footballers from South Australia
Australian military personnel of World War II